Jonesville Methodist Campground is a historic Methodist campground located near Jonesville, Lee County, Virginia.  The property consists of a broad lawn where the congregation erect their tents, and the permanent pavilion-like auditorium.  The auditorium is a gable roofed structure measuring 76 feet long and 36 feet wide, with a 12 feet deep shed addition. The camp ground land was given to the trustees of the Methodist
Church in 1827 by Elkanah Wynn.

It was listed on the National Register of Historic Places in 1974.

References

Event venues on the National Register of Historic Places in Virginia
Buildings and structures in Lee County, Virginia
National Register of Historic Places in Lee County, Virginia
Campgrounds in the United States
Methodism in Virginia